The discography of English electronic band Orchestral Manoeuvres in the Dark (OMD) includes 13 studio albums and 40 singles, among other releases. The group issued their debut single, "Electricity", in 1979, and achieved several international top 10 hits during the 1980s and 1990s, including their signature songs "Enola Gay" (1980) and "If You Leave" (1986). OMD's albums Architecture & Morality (1981), The Best of OMD (1988) and Sugar Tax (1991) were certified platinum or higher in the UK; the gold-certified Dazzle Ships (1983) became one of the band's most influential works.

OMD disbanded in 1996 but reformed in 2006, and have since re-established themselves as a top 10 presence on international album charts. The group's overall record sales stand in excess of 40 million, with sales of 15 million albums and 25 million singles as of 2019.

Albums

Studio albums

Live albums

Compilation albums

EPs

Singles

1970s–1980s

1990s–present

Videography

Video albums

Music videos

Soundtracks

Notes

References

Discographies of British artists
Rock music group discographies
New wave discographies